Consensus-seeking decision-making (also known as consensus/voting hybrid decision-making) is a term sometimes used to describe a formal decision process similar to the decision-making  variant known as "formal consensus" but with the additional option of a fallback voting procedure if consensus appears unattainable during the consensus-seeking phase of the deliberations.

Ideally the fallback voting option is only exercised after all reasonable attempts to address concerns have been exhausted, although in practice this might be constrained by time limits imposed on the deliberations.  When consensus is deemed to be unattainable, either the "presenter" of a proposal or the "facilitator" of the deliberations is empowered to choose the closing option of a fallback vote.  Other possible closing options may include "refer to committee", "test for stand-asides", and "withdraw the proposal".

The fallback voting procedure is sometimes characterized by a relatively high vote required for approval, such as 80%, with the idea that this approximates decision by consensus.  However, there is controversy  over whether this feature of the process truly approximates decision by consensus or subverts it by encouraging minoritarianism.

Consensus-based groups adopting fallback voting processes often do so in order to facilitate timely decision-making.   However, there is controversy over whether any voting option (or the underlying time constraints) undermines the ability of a consensus process to effectively resolve minority concerns.

Many Green party organizations have adopted consensus-seeking decision-making processes.

References

Steven Saint and James R. Lawson, "Rules for Reaching Consensus"
*C.T. Butler, "On Conflict and Consensus"

External links
Green Party of California (GPCA) Bylaws
GPCA bylaws discussion post, 1/31/2005
Formal Consensus

Group decision-making
Consensus
Evaluation methods
Power sharing